Regla Maritza Bell MacKenzie (July 6, 1970 in Havana) is a volleyball player from Cuba who won the gold medal three times at the Olympic Games from 1992–2000, and the World Championship in 1998 with the Cuban national team.

Career
She won three gold medals in a row at the Summer Olympics, in 1992, 1996 and 2000.  She won two gold medals in a row at the FIVB Women's World Championships, in 1994, and 1998. She also won four gold medals in a row at the FIVB Women's World Cup, in 1989, 1991, 1995, and 1999.

For the regular season of the 2008/2009 Spanish Superliga, Bell was elected MVP and Best Scorer after hitting 439 kills during that regular league.

Bell played for São Caetano/Blausiegel in Brazil for the 2009/2010 season.  She played for the Indonesian club Monokwari Valeria during the 2012-2013 season of the Indonesian volleyball league and later signed up for a two-month contract with PLDT HOME TVolution a Philippine volleyball team which participated at the 2014 Asian Women's Club Volleyball Championship. She played for the Spanish team Fígaro Peluqueros Tenerife for the 2010/2011 season.

Clubs
  Ciudad Habana (1991–1997)
  Assid Ester Napoli (1998)
  Despar Perugia (1998–2000)
  UCAM Murcia (2002–2004)
  Grupo 2002 Murcia (2005–2006)
  Promociones Percan (2006–2007)
  Ciudad Las Palmas G.C. Cantur (2007–2009)
  São Caetano/Blausiegel (2009–2010)
  Fígaro Peluqueros Tenerife (2010–2011)
  Nuchar Eurochamp Murillo (2011–2012)
  Manokwari Valeria (2012–2013)
  PLDT HOME TVolution (2014)

Awards

Individuals
 1993 FIVB Volleyball Women's World Grand Champions Cup "Most Valuable Player"
 1993 FIVB Volleyball Women's World Grand Champions Cup "Best Spiker"
 1993 FIVB Volleyball Women's World Grand Champions Cup "Best Receiver"
 1997 FIVB Volleyball Women's World Grand Champions Cup "Best Spiker"
 2009 Spanish Superliga Regular Season "Most Valuable Player"
 2009 Spanish Superliga Regular Season "Best Scorer"

Clubs
 1999 Italian Cup -  Champion, with Despar Perugia

References

External links
 Italian League Profile

1970 births
Living people
Cuban women's volleyball players
Volleyball players at the 1992 Summer Olympics
Volleyball players at the 1996 Summer Olympics
Volleyball players at the 2000 Summer Olympics
Olympic volleyball players of Cuba
Olympic gold medalists for Cuba
Sportspeople from Havana
Olympic medalists in volleyball
Medalists at the 2000 Summer Olympics
Medalists at the 1996 Summer Olympics
Medalists at the 1992 Summer Olympics
Opposite hitters
Outside hitters
Cuban expatriates in Italy
Cuban expatriate sportspeople in Spain
Cuban expatriates in Brazil
Cuban expatriates in the Philippines
Expatriate volleyball players in Italy
Expatriate volleyball players in Spain
Expatriate volleyball players in Brazil
Expatriate volleyball players in the Philippines
Expatriate volleyball players in Indonesia
Pan American Games medalists in volleyball
Pan American Games gold medalists for Cuba
Pan American Games silver medalists for Cuba
Medalists at the 1991 Pan American Games
Medalists at the 1995 Pan American Games
Medalists at the 1999 Pan American Games
20th-century Cuban women
20th-century Cuban people
21st-century Cuban women